Colleen Furgeson (born 21 November 1998) is a Marshallese swimmer. She competed in the women's 50 metre freestyle event at the 2016 Summer Olympics, where she ranked 58th with a time of 28.16 seconds. She did not advance to the semifinals. She competed at the 2020 Summer Olympics, in Women's 100 m freestyle.

She competed at the 2016 FINA World Swimming Championships, 2017 FINA World Championships, and 2018 Oceania Swimming Championships.

References

External links
 

1998 births
Living people
Marshallese female swimmers
Olympic swimmers of the Marshall Islands
Swimmers at the 2016 Summer Olympics
Place of birth missing (living people)
Marshallese female freestyle swimmers
Swimmers at the 2020 Summer Olympics